Corentin Carne (born June 18, 1996) is a French professional basketball player. He plays shooting guard position. He is currently under contract with French Pro A side Antibes Sharks.

References 

1996 births
Living people
Élan Béarnais players
Étoile Charleville-Mézières players
French men's basketball players
Nanterre 92 players
People from Lens, Pas-de-Calais
Sportspeople from Pas-de-Calais
Shooting guards